Muttanchery is a place in Kozhikode district in the Indian state of Kerala. Its a place surrounded with different hills.

Geography 
It is located about 25 km east of Kozhikode (Calicut) city on the Kunnamangalam-Narikkuni Road. Nearby places are Kunnamangalam, Narikkuni, and Arambram.

Education 
Hassaniya aided upper primary school is located in Muttancherry. The institution came into existence as a primary school in 1935.

Culture 
One of the famous Dhargha of Madavoor CM Valiyullahi is 1 kilometer away.
Crescent arts and sports club,dosth arts and sports club ,Red ARTS Muttanchery are the main cultural centres in muttanchery.

References

Thamarassery area
Villages in Kozhikode district